Martin-Pierre Gauthier (1790–1855) was a French architect.

1790 births
1855 deaths
People from Troyes
19th-century French architects
Recipients of the Legion of Honour
Members of the Académie des beaux-arts
Prix de Rome for architecture
Academic staff of École Polytechnique